The AK-19 is a 5.56×45mm NATO assault rifle designed by Kalashnikov Concern for the export market.

Revealed during the International Military-Technical Forum ARMY-2020 exhibition, the AK-19 is a variant of the updated AK-12, revealed at the same time, chambered in 5.56×45mm NATO, which was put into series production in 2022.

Design details
Like the updated AK-12, the AK-19 features a redesigned polymer L-shaped stock, a redesigned pistol grip and trigger guard, and a new rotary diopter rear sight. Unlike the AK-12, the AK-19 features a birdcage-type flash suppressor that features slots for a quick detachable sound suppressor.

References 

 
 

5.56×45mm NATO assault rifles
Assault rifles of Russia
Kalashnikov Concern products
Kalashnikov derivatives